Risi Competizione is an Italo-American auto racing Ferrari factory-backed team formed by Giuseppe Risi in 1997. Initially, the team had a partnership with Doyle Racing using the name Doyle-Risi Racing, but soon Giuseppe Risi took full control of the project and it was rebranded with its current name in 2000. Much of Risi Competizione's success has come through the use of Ferrari machines.

Racing history
Risi Competizione was initially created as a competition arm of Ferrari of Houston, a car dealership owned by Giuseppe Risi. Doyle Racing, wishing to replace their outdated Riley & Scott sports prototype, was able to use Risi's connection to Ferrari to purchase two new Ferrari 333 SPs. Risi in turn was able to promote his Houston dealership. The first of the team's 333 SPs was planned for use in the IMSA GT Championship, while the second was kept in Europe to prepare for the 24 Hours of Le Mans, to which the team had already been invited due to the success of Doyle Racing the previous year in IMSA.

The new partnership was able to quickly find success as the team won in only the second race of the season, drivers Wayne Taylor and Eric van de Poele earning victory at Las Vegas Motor Speedway. In Europe for Le Mans, Taylor and Van de Poele were joined by Fermín Vélez, and although they were unable to win the race overall, they scored victory in their class with an eighth-place finish. Back in the United States, Doyle-Risi earned their third victory of the year at the inaugural Petit Le Mans at Road Atlanta, winning the race overall against several teams they had competed against at Le Mans. With two victories for the year, Doyle-Risi won the team championship for the World Sports Car class, while Taylor was second and Van de Poele third in the drivers' championship.

Doyle-Risi opened the 1999 season by competing in the 24 Hours of Daytona, finishing the race in second place and only two laps behind the race winner. Doyle-Risi followed this by joining the American Le Mans Series, a replacement for the previous year's IMSA GT Championship. Both of their 333 SPs were entered for the full season. However, facing stiffer competition from Audi, BMW and Panoz, the team was unable to score any victories over the year, although they did score a season-best result of fourth at the Grand Prix of Atlanta. The team finished the season fourth in the LMP championship.
Giuseppe Risi took full control of the team in 2000, rebranding it as Risi Competizione, and retained one of the 333 SPs from Doyle. Ralf Kelleners and Mimmo Schiattarella were signed, and Risi moved to the new Rolex Sports Car Series. The team earned two second-place finishes and scored fourth in the team championship. Schiattarella earned fourth in the drivers' championship, while Kelleners was sixth. In 2001, Risi entered a sole 333 SP at the 24 Hours of Daytona but failed to finish, and the team chose to not compete for the rest of the season.

During Risi's year away from competition, the company began development work on a competition version of the 360 Modena for Ferrari. Although busy with development, Risi agreed to a partnership with Rand Racing to run a pair of Nissan-powered Lola B2K/40 prototypes in the SRPII class of the Rolex Sports Car Series in 2002. The Rand-Risi team swept the ten-race season, winning their class in every event and clinching the championships. Meanwhile, Risi's 360 debuted in two of the final rounds of the American Le Mans Series season, earning podiums in their class for both races.
For 2003, Risi's 360 was entered in the Daytona 24 Hours and earned second place overall, beating multiple faster prototypes. The team then moved permanently to the American Le Mans Series, running a pair of the new 360s. The team earned second place in their class championship, while Risi Competizione also returned to the 24 Hours of Le Mans for the first time since their 1998 victory, finishing in 27th place. Risi continued their development of the 360 Modena into 2004, eventually upsetting the series' Porsche dominance with a victory in their class at the New England Grand Prix. Difficulties in completing races, however, led the team to eventually finish the year fifth in the championship.

Now that their development of the 360 Modena was completed, Risi Competizione was chosen by Ferrari in 2005 to campaign another new car in the American Le Mans Series, this time the MC12 for Ferrari's sister brand Maserati. Running under the Maserati Corse name, the team earned several third-place finishes in their GT1 class, but due to the MC12 not complying with certain ACO & ALMS rules, the team was not able to be awarded any points in the class championship. The team returned to the GT2 class in 2006 running a replacement for the 360 Modena, the F430. Assigned factory Ferrari drivers Mika Salo and Jaime Melo, Risi Competizione earned four victories and eventually earned the team championship, although Salo finished ninth in the drivers' championship.

Risi improved over the next season, earning eight victories out of the twelve races in the American Le Mans Series, including the 12 Hours of Sebring. The team once again secured the team championship, while Salo and Melo share the drivers' championship. Both F430s also attended the 24 Hours of Le Mans for the third time in the team's history, where a car used in partnership with Krohn Racing finished 17th overall and second in the GT2 class.

For Risi Competizione's 2008 campaign in the American Le Mans Series, two F430s were once again in use. The team's primary car is once again piloted by defending champions Salo and Melo. The second car is used in partnership with Krohn Racing for several races during the season, but driven by Patrick Friesacher and Harrison Brix for the remainder of the events. The Risi team finished 3rd in the ALMS GT2 championship behind Krohn Racing and Flying Lizard Motorsports with Salo and Melo finishing 7th in the drivers championship.

Risi also entered the 24 Hours of Le Mans for the second year in a row, entering a Salo and Melo along with Ferrari factory driver Gianmaria Bruni in their primary car, while Krohn Racing used Tracy Krohn, Niclas Jönsson, and Eric van de Poele in their cooperative entry. Although the Krohn entry was the first retirement of the race, the main Risi entry went on to take the GT2 class victory, 19th overall. This marked their second victory at Le Mans in four attempts.

Risi kicked off the 2009 American Le Mans Series season with a GT2 class win at the 12 Hours of Sebring. Continuing competition with drivers Mika Salo and Jaime Melo. Pierre Kaffer would join the team for the longer rounds. Risi would face fierce competition all season long ending the season with only one other win at the 2009 Petit Le Mans round. With those two wins, and many strong finishes, Risi would finish 2nd in the championship behind Flying Lizard Motorsports with 137 points.

For their third straight year, Risi Competizione received an invitation and would compete in the 2009 24 Hours of Le Mans using the same driver lineup from their ALMS entry. Risi's F430 would once again overcome its rivals and take home the GT2 class victory with an 18th overall finish. Krohn Racing's F430 entered in partnership with Risi would finish 3rd in the GT2 class and 22nd overall.

In 2014, Risi competed in the GTLM class of the newly created United SportsCar Championship, running a Ferrari 458 Italia GTLM driven by Giancarlo Fisichella and Pierre Kaffer. They took class victories at Road America and Virginia, finishing the championship in 6th in GTLM with 298 points.

The following year they continued to run with the same car and drivers in the 2015 United SportsCar Championship. They failed to pick up any class wins, finishing in 4th place in GTLM in the championship with 295 points.

In 2016, Risi used the new Ferrari 488 GTE in the WeatherTech SportsCar Championship with a driver lineup of Giancarlo Fisichella and Toni Vilander, scoring a class win in the season finale at Petit Le Mans and finishing 5th in the championship standings. Risi once again entered the famous 24 Hours of Le Mans race where they were joined by Matteo Malucelli. The team finished second in their class.

Risi started the 2017 season in the IMSA WeatherTech SportsCar Championship with the same drivers and the same car. They repeated their Le Mans entry but failed to finish after being hit by a competitor from another class. After the 24 Hours of Le Mans, they temporarily withdrew from the IMSA series.

In 2018 Risi competed at the 24 Hours of Daytona, 12 Hours of Sebring and Petit Le Mans with Ferrari factory drivers without scoring a podium. They finish in P3 at the 24 Hours of Le Mans in GTE Am class in a Weathertech sponsored car driven by Jeroen Bleekemolen, Ben Keating and Luca Stolz.

In 2019 Risi made only 3 races, scoring a GTLM class win at MOTUL Petit Le Mans with the Le Mans-winning crew Alessandro Pier Guidi, James Calado and Daniel Serra, and a runner-up finish at the 24 Hours of Daytona with the same drivers and Davide Rigon. They raced also the 24 Hours of Le Mans.

In 2020 Risi contest the 24 Hours of Daytona and 24 Hours of Le Mans. The team announce the participation at the 12 Hours of Sebring in March, but after the race re-schedule in November due to Covid-19 pandemic the team doesn't enter the race.

In 2021 the team will contest the 24 Hours of Daytona with Ferrari factory drivers Alessandro Pier Guidi, Davide Rigon and James Calado joined by Jules Gounon.

References

External links
Risi Competizione
Ferrari of Houston

American auto racing teams
24 Hours of Le Mans teams
Grand American Road Racing Association teams
American Le Mans Series teams
WeatherTech SportsCar Championship teams
FIA Sportscar Championship entrants
Auto racing teams established in 1997
Ferrari in motorsport